Rokitno  is a village in Biała Podlaska County, Lublin Voivodeship, in eastern Poland, close to the border with Belarus. It is the seat of the gmina (administrative district) called Gmina Rokitno.

Early history
The land of Rokitno was originally owned by Princess Anila Rzyszczewska. Rokitno was once thought to have been a much larger town, extending eastward to the villages of Sohov and Osnitzek, prior to being reduced by decree.

Films
 "Children of the Forest: The Life of Yona Bromberg". In the documentary Yona Bromberg, Holocaust survivor, recalls the German occupation of Rokitno during an interview with filmmaker Eduardo Montes-Bradley.

References

Villages in Biała Podlaska County
Siedlce Governorate
Kholm Governorate
Lublin Voivodeship (1919–1939)
Holocaust locations in Poland